The 1947 Goodall Cup was the 26th year that the Australian inter-state ice hockey 3 game series was played. Victoria won the Cup for the first time in 25 years.

The series

Game one
26 July 1947 In front of a packed Sydney Glaciarium the first game was won by Victoria. J. McLauchlan scored for New South Wales in the last minutes of the game.  

Game two
29 July 1947 Victoria won the 2nd game of the inter-state series and secured the Goodall Cup. Victoria opened with a 2 - 0 lead in the first period with a goal by A. Sengotti and R. Jones. In the second period, New South Wales reduced the lead when G. Thorn scored. In the third period, E. Winter scored for Victoria.

Game three
31 July 1947 In the third game of the series, New South Wales completely outplayed Victoria and won the game 6 - 1. The first two games had been won by Victoria so the Goodall Cup had already been won.

Teams

Victoria

The Victoria team was made from the following players:

Forwards
 A. Sengotta
 E. Winter
 John Tuckerman
 David Cunningham
 R. Sullivan
 Russel Jones
 Noel Derrick
Defence
 John Whyte
 W. Harrison
 C. Mitchell
Goaltender
 Russ Carson

New South Wales
The New South Wales team was made from the following players:

 S. Green
 Geoff Thorne
 J. McLauchlan
 P. Wendt

See also

 Goodall Cup
 Ice Hockey Australia
 Australian Ice Hockey League

References

Goodall Cup
1947 in Australian sport
1947 in ice hockey
Sports competitions in Sydney
1940s in Sydney